Mijit Arapat (born 8 September 1991) is a Chinese footballer currently playing as a right-back for Xinjiang Tianshan Leopard.

Career statistics

Club
.

References

1991 births
Living people
Chinese footballers
Association football defenders
China League One players
Xinjiang Tianshan Leopard F.C. players
21st-century Chinese people